UEG may refer to:
 European Union of Gymnastics, a sports federation
 Ubbo-Emmius-Gymnasium, a school in Leer, Germany
 Uniform electron gas
 Union-Elektricitäts-Gesellschaft, now part of AEG
 Universal Energy Group, a Canadian energy company
 United European Gastroenterology, a non-profit organisation combining European societies concerned with digestive health
 United Earth Government, A fictional organization that appeared in the film series "The Wandering Earth"